Lido di Jesolo in Jesolo, in the province of Venice, Italy, is a 15 km-long beach.

Notes and references

External links

Jesolo Tourism 
Jesolo's Portal Non-profit portal with some information and utilities about Jesolo.

Cities and towns in Veneto
Frazioni of the Metropolitan City of Venice